Moustafa Sadek (born 31 January 1972) is an Egyptian former footballer. He competed in the men's tournament at the 1992 Summer Olympics, with Egypt being knocked out in the group stages.

References

External links
 
 

1972 births
Living people
Egyptian footballers
Egypt international footballers
Olympic footballers of Egypt
Footballers at the 1992 Summer Olympics
Place of birth missing (living people)
Association football forwards
Al Mokawloon Al Arab SC players